NYRA is an abbreviation for the following groups:
 National Youth Rights Association, a United States youth rights organization
 New York Racing Association, The NY State franchisee which runs racing operations at three New York State Thoroughbred racecourses; Aqueduct, Belmont Park and Saratoga Racecourse.